MI14, or British Military Intelligence, Section 14 was a department of the British Directorate of Military Intelligence. It was an intelligence agency of the War Office, which specialised in intelligence about Germany. Originally part of MI3, during the Second World War the German sub-department's expertise and analysis became so important to the war effort that it was spun off into its own Military Intelligence section.

One of MI14's most valuable sources, codenamed COLUMBA, consisted of reports returned by pigeons dropped over Nazi-occupied countries in packs containing a miniature spying kit.

Now defunct, the foreign intelligence remit is handled by the Secret Intelligence Service (MI6).

External links
 What happened to MI1 - MI4? MI5 FAQ
Documents reveal role of 'winged spies'

Defunct United Kingdom intelligence agencies
Military communications of the United Kingdom
British intelligence services of World War II
War Office in World War II